Hylomus rhinoparvus is a species of dragon millipede in the family Paradoxosomatidae. It is only known from Houaphanh Province of northeastern Laos.

It was first described, along with H. rhinoceros, in 2015. Both species were discovered in Laos, the first dragon millipedes identified there, H. rhinoparvus in the north of the country and H. rhinoceros in the south. The holotype is in the Museum of Zoology, Chulalongkorn University, Bangkok, Thailand.

The color is dark brown.

References 

Millipedes of Asia
Arthropods of Laos
Endemic fauna of Laos
Animals described in 2015